Electric Landlady is Kirsty MacColl's third studio album. Released in 1991, it was her second Virgin Records release and second collaboration with producer/husband Steve Lillywhite. The title was given when MacColl found it to be the name that was accidentally written on some early pressings of Jimi Hendrix's album Electric Ladyland.

Electric Landlady was MacColl's most successful U.S. release, owing to the lead track "Walking Down Madison", which peaked at No. 4 on the Billboard Modern Rock Tracks chart. The longest song of the album, it features guest vocals by rapper Aniff Cousins, and was originally written for Alison Moyet.

Background
In a 1991 interview with Melody Maker, MacColl spoke of her intention for the album's direction in comparison to her 1989 album Kite, "I was listening to Kite for the first time in a while and I thought, 'Well that's really good, but I could make the next album even more enjoyable for myself if I could actually dance to it without being paralytic! But I didn't want to make an album with computers. A lot of people think that dance means you have to have the beats per minute on the sleeve, but, to me, a waltz is a dance." Speaking of the larger number of co-writes on Electric Landlady, she added, "With Kite, I felt I had to prove that I wasn't this bimbo girl-next-door I'd been portrayed as. I wanted to make the point that, yes, I can write a song, pal! I didn't feel that I had to prove myself this time."

Critical reception

Upon its release, Andrew Mueller of Melody Maker considered the album to be disappointing in comparison to the "frequently brilliant" Kite. He felt that melodically there "aren't any tunes to speak of" and noted the lack of MacColl's "customary razor wit" in the lyrics. He summarised, "Kite was such a great album because it was happy to be an album of great pop songs. Electric Landlady is such a resounding duffer because it's so pointlessly eclectic that you can't get a grip on it anywhere. It's like Kirsty's decided that she wants to impersonate every band she's ever lent that gorgeous voice to at least once." Steve Lamacq of NME considered it "an adult but very confused record". He believed MacColl was "probably writing as well as ever", but felt the album featured too many guest musicians and producers who "all know too much about recording", resulting in "too much [of an] emphasis on arrangements and production, which detracts from the actual mainspring, Kirsty's voice/lyrics/simplicity". He concluded, "Electric Landlady, as a whole, has a lot of things you like - outspokenness and invention - but buries them under the weight of professionalism."

Track listing

2012 deluxe edition bonus CD 
The first disc contains the twelve tracks from the original album.

Personnel
Credits adapted from the album's liner notes.

Musicians
 Kirsty MacColl – vocals, keyboards (3), guitar (8), autoharp (10)
 Elliot Randall – guitar (1, 2, 6-8, 11)
 Pete Glenister – guitar (2, 5-8), acoustic guitar (4, 9-11)
 Mark E. Nevin – guitar (4, 6), acoustic guitar (4, 9-12)
 Ian Aitken – acoustic guitar (2, 7, 11)
 Johnny Marr – guitar (1, 3), keyboards (1, 3)
 Colin Stuart – mandolin (9), acoustic guitar (10, 11)
 Philip Chevron – guitar (12)
Jem Finer – banjo (12)
Terry Woods – cittern (12)
 Sal Cuevas – bass (2, 3, 5, 7, 8)
 Pino Palladino – bass (4, 6, 9-11)
 Guy Pratt – bass (1)
 Darryl Hunt – bass (12)
Oscar Hernández – piano (2, 5, 7, 8)
Hamish MacColl – keyboards (9)
Ed Shearmur – piano (6), clavinet (6)
Trevor Gray – bass synthesizer (1), organ (1), programming (1)
James Fearnley – accordion (12)
 Robby Ameen – drums (2, 3, 5, 7, 8)
 Mel Gaynor – drums (4, 6, 9-11)
 David Palmer – drums (1, 3)
 Andrew Ranken – drums (12)
Dave Valentin – ocarina (9), flutes (9), pan pipe (9)
Judd Lander – harmonica (2)
Spider Stacy – whistle (12)
Jody Linscott – percussion (1)
Milton Cardona – percussion (2-5, 7-9, 11)
José Mangual Jr. – percussion (2-5, 7-9, 11)
Marc Quiñones – percussion (2, 3, 5, 7-9, 11)
Adrian Lillywhite – percussion (6, 7, 12)
Angel Fernandez – trumpet (5), brass arrangement (4, 5, 11), string arrangements (5)
Leopoldo Pineda – trombone (5)
Lewis Kahn – trombone (4, 5, 11), violin (4, 5)
Ité Jerez – trumpet (4, 5, 11)
Steve Sacks – alto saxophone (4, 11), soprano saxophone (11)
Joseph J. Shepley – trumpet (5)
Felix Farrar – violin (5)
Lloyd Carter – violin (5)
Bob Loveday – violin (7, 10)
Enrique Orengo – cello (5)
Aniff Cousins – rap (1)
Jimmy Chambers – background vocals (1)
George Chandler – background vocals (1)

Technical
Steve Lillywhite – production, additional mix (1)
John Brough – engineer (Ealing, Moody, Metropolis and Townhouse Studios), mixing (1)
Alan Douglas – engineer (Townhouse Studios)
Jon Fausty – engineer (Electric Lady Studios), mixing
Pete Lewis – assistant engineer (Townhouse Studios), mixing
Noel Haris – assistant engineer (Ealing, Moody and Metropolis Studios) 
Michael White – assistant engineer (Electric Lady Studios)
Howard Gray – additional production (1), additional mix (1)
Chris Bandy – assistant engineer and mixing (1)
Bill Smith Studio – design
Kirsty MacColl – design, illustration
Charles Dickins – photography 
Sarah Tuft – photography
Paul Williams – production (BBC Sessions)

Charts

References

External links
Electric Landlady at KirstyMacColl.com

1991 albums
Kirsty MacColl albums
Albums produced by Steve Lillywhite
Virgin Records albums